Fresco  is a town in southern Ivory Coast. It is a sub-prefecture of and the seat of Fresco Department in Gbôklé Region, Bas-Sassandra District. Fresco is also a commune.

In 2014, the population of the sub-prefecture of Fresco was 41,058.

Villages
The nine villages of the sub-prefecture of Fresco and their population in 2014 are:
 Bohico (203)
 Fresco (8 533)
 Zakaréko (4 260)
 Zégban 1 (6 401)
 Zégban 2 (4 278)
 Bolorouko (3 047)
 Dassioko (4 653)
 Kosso (5 313)
 Zuzuoko (4 370)

References

Sub-prefectures of Gbôklé
Communes of Gbôklé